Anteaeolidiella takanosimensis, is a species of sea slug, an aeolid nudibranch. It is a marine gastropod mollusc in the family Aeolidiidae.

Distribution
This species was described from specimens collected at the island of Takano-Sima, Tateyama Bay, Japan.

Description
The body of Anteaeolidiella takanosimensis is translucent white with orange linear markings.

References

Aeolidiidae
Gastropods described in 1930